A limbal nodule is any nodular lesion at the limbus (junction of the cornea and sclera) of the eye.

The differential diagnosis for a limbal nodule can include:

Pinguecula
Early Pterygium
Foreign body / foreign body granuloma
Phlycten, an inflamed nodule of lymphoid tissue
Episcleritis
Scleritis
Granuloma
Limbal dermoid, a kind of choristoma (NB: in other organs dermoid can refer to a teratoma)
 malignant melanoma
 naevus

References

Eye diseases